Verkhneye Yakutino is a rural locality (a village) in Tregubovskoye Rural Settlement, Velikoustyugsky District, Vologda Oblast, Russia. The population was 112 as of 2002.

Geography 
Verkhneye Yakutino is located 24 km southwest of Veliky Ustyug (the district's administrative centre) by road. Luzhevitsa is the nearest rural locality.

References 

Rural localities in Velikoustyugsky District